Backwoods Gallery is a contemporary art gallery located in the Melbourne suburb of Collingwood, Australia. Founded in August 2010   the gallery exhibits Australian and international artists with a focus on urban contemporary art, street art and illustration.

In December 2013, Complex magazine listed Backwoods Gallery in the top ten "Street Art Galleries You Should Know About".

Exhibitions

Exhibitions 2010

Exhibitions 2011

Exhibitions 2012

Exhibitions 2013

Exhibitions 2014

References

2010 establishments in Australia
Art galleries established in 2010
Art museums and galleries in Melbourne
Contemporary art galleries in Australia